Michael Myers or Mike Myers may refer to:

Michael Myers (Halloween), a fictional character and antagonist in the Halloween films
Michael Myers (judge) (1873–1950), sixth Chief Justice of the Supreme Court of New Zealand
Michael Myers (New York politician) (1753–1814), American politician from New York
Michael Myers (Pennsylvania politician) (born 1943), American politician from Pennsylvania
Michael Myers (American football) (born 1976), National Football League defensive tackle
Michael Myers (racing driver) (born 2001), American race car driver
Mike Myers (born 1963), American-British-Canadian actor, comedian, screenwriter and film producer
Mike Myers (baseball) (born 1969), American Major League Baseball pitcher

See also
Mike Meyers (pitcher) (born 1977), former professional baseball pitcher
Mike Meyers (outfielder) (born 1993), minor league baseball outfielder
Michael Mayer (disambiguation)
Michael Meyer (disambiguation)
 Meyers